The 2018 Florida Chief Financial Officer election took place on November 6, 2018. Incumbent Republican Chief Financial Officer Jimmy Patronis, who was appointed in 2017, successfully ran for a full term, defeating Democratic nominee Jeremy Ring, a former state senator, in the general election.

Republican primary

Candidates

Declared
 Jimmy Patronis, incumbent Chief Financial Officer of Florida

Declined
Aaron Bean, state senator
Jeff Brandes, state senator
Lenny Curry, Mayor of Jacksonville
 Don Gaetz, former state senator
 Tom Grady, Florida Board of Education member and former state representative
Teresa Jacobs, Mayor of Orange County
 Jack Latvala, state senator (running for governor)
Tom Lee, state senator and nominee in 2006
 Carlos López-Cantera, lieutenant governor and candidate for U.S. Senate in 2016
Seth McKeel, former state representative
 Pat Neal, real estate developer and former state senator
Will Weatherford, former Speaker of the Florida House of Representatives

Endorsements

Democratic primary

Candidates

Declared
 Jeremy Ring, former state senator

Declined
 Kevin Beckner, former Hillsborough County Commissioner
 Bob Buckhorn, Mayor of Tampa
 Patrick Murphy, former U.S. Representative and nominee for U.S. Senate in 2016
 Jack Seiler, Mayor of Fort Lauderdale

Endorsements

General election

Polling

Results

References

External links
Official campaign websites
 Jimmy Patronis (R) for CFO
 Jeremy Ring (D) for CFO

Chief Financial Officer
Florida Chief Financial Officer elections
Florida Chief Financial Officer